Castiglione is an Italian habitational name from any of numerous places named with this word, from medieval Latin castellio (genitive castellionis) ‘fortification’, ‘small castle’.
People with the surname include:

People with the surname

 Godffredo da Castiglione, Pope Celestine IV died Rome, 10 November 1241
 Baldassare Castiglione (1478–1529), Italian Renaissance writer and diplomat, best known for The Courtier book
 Giovanni Castiglione (1420-1460), Italian bishop and cardinal
 Giovanni Battista Castiglione (1516–1598), Italian tutor to Princess (later Queen) Elizabeth I
 Giovanni Benedetto Castiglione (1609–1664), Italian (Genoese) painter and printmaker
 Giovanni Francesco Mauro Melchiore Salvemini di Castiglione (1704-1791), Italian mathematician
 Giuseppe Castiglione (Jesuit) (1688–1766), Italian painter and Jesuit missionary
 Pierre François Charles Augereau, duc de Castiglione (1757–1816), Marshal of France and French general
 Jose Pablo Martinez del Rio-Castiglione (fl. 1859), Italo-Mexican nobleman in the court of Maximilian I of Mexico
 Virginia Oldoini, Countess di Castiglione (1837–1899), Italian courtesan and mistress of Napoleon III
 Giuseppe Castiglione (1829–1908), Italian painter
 Pete Castiglione (1921-2010), American baseball player
 Joe Castiglione (born 1947), Boston Red Sox radio announcer
 Joe Castiglione (athletic director) (born 1957), at the University of Oklahoma
 Giuseppe Castiglione (politician) (born 1963), Italian politician
 Nancy Castiglione (born 1981), Canadian actress active in the Philippines
 Salvatore Castiglione (1620–1676), an Italian painter of the Baroque period

Fictional characters
 Francis "Frank" Castle (born Castiglione), Sicilian-American vigilante the Punisher from Marvel Comics

See also 
 Castiglioni
 Castigliano

References

Jewish surnames
Italian-language surnames